Aaron Ward may refer to:
Aaron Ward (baseball) (1896–1961), American baseball infielder
Aaron Ward (ice hockey) (born 1973), retired Canadian professional ice hockey defenceman
Aaron Ward (representative) (1790–1867), United States representative from New York
Aaron Ward (sailor) (1851–1918), admiral in the United States Navy
Aaron Montgomery Ward (1844–1913), founder of the Montgomery Ward store chain
USS Aaron Ward, the name of three ships in the United States Navy